Ischasia rufina is a species of beetle in the family Cerambycidae. It was described by Thomson in 1864.

References

Rhinotragini
Beetles described in 1864